Aussenkehr (referring to the flow of the Orange at this location) is a farm on the banks of the Orange River in the south of Namibia hard on the border with South Africa. Aussenkehr was established as a farm in 1910 when an Imperial German investment corporation acquired the land and started several irrigation projects. Over time, Aussenkehr has evolved into a large settlement accommodating workers employed nearby. Estimations of how many people live here vary between 7,000 and almost 30,000.

The settlement features a government clinic and a primary school. It is planned to develop Aussenkehr into a town. 6,000 erven have been surveyed and water and sewerage systems have been built but the construction of houses on the delineated plots has not yet started. Many residents have no access to safe drinking water and sanitation and use the river both as water supply and a toilet. Living conditions in the settlement have been described as "appalling".

Serbian immigrant Dušan Vasiljević bought the farm Aussenkehr in 1988 to develop grape production, after a previous, similar project had failed. There is less than  average annual rainfall but the farm includes  of riverfront and has a government-approved quota to draw water for irrigation from the Orange River. The Norotshama River Resort is located on the farm as a tourism venture.

The extreme climatic conditions—summer temperatures can reach  in the river valley—provide the area with an advantage over other grape producers, as Aussenkehr's table grapes can be harvested three to five weeks earlier than elsewhere.

References

External links
 

Populated places in the ǁKaras Region
Farms in Namibia